This was the first edition of the tournament.

Taylor Fritz won the title after defeating Bradley Klahn 3–6, 7–5, 6–0 in the final.

Seeds

Draw

Finals

Top half

Bottom half

References
Main Draw
Qualifying Draw

Oracle Challenger Series – Newport Beach
Oracle Challenger Series - Newport Beach - Men's Singles